The 2011 Regional League Division 2 (also known as the AIS League for sponsorship reasons) was the 6th season of the Regional League Division 2, it had redirected from the division 2, since its establishment in 2006. The 77 clubs will be divided into 5 groups (regions).

Regional League Championships 2011 was contested by the five regional league winners and runners up of the 3rd level championships of Thailand. The two best 3rd placed teams from the regional leagues also take part

Twelve teams were split into two groups of A & B, with the top two teams from group A & B gaining promotion to the Thai 1st Division for the 2012 campaign, along with this, the two group winners would play off to determine the overall champions.

Format
The qualification structure is as follows:
Regional League round: Regional League each Zone, champion and runner-up or Highest 3rd point will advance to the Champions League round.
Champions League round: It is divided into two groups, Group A, Group B. The top two teams of each group will Promotion spot for the Thai Division 1 League and Final,3/4 Place Playoff.

2011 Regional League round table All locations

2011
red Zone:2011 Regional League Division 2 Bangkok Metropolitan Region 
Yellow Zone:2011 Regional League Division 2 Central & Eastern Region
Green Zone: 2011 Regional League Division 2 Northern Region Region 
  Orange Zone:2011 Regional League Division 2 North Eastern Region 
Blue Zone:2011 Regional League Division 2 Southern Region

List of qualified teams
Last Update October 1, 2011

Bangkok & field (2)
 Kasetsart University FC  (Winner)
 North Bangkok College FC (Runner-up)

Central & Eastern (2)
 Ratchaburi FC (Winner)
 Rayong FC (Runner-up)

Northern (3)
 Phitsanulok FC (Winner)
 Lamphun Warrior (Runner-up)
 Phichit FC (Highest 3rd point)

North Eastern (3)
 Roi Et United (Winner)
 Loei City (Runner-up)
 Nakhon Ratchasima FC (Highest 3rd point)

Southern (2)
 Krabi FC (Winner)
 Phattalung FC (Runner-up)

League table

Group A

Group B

3/4 Place Playoff

Final

Champions
The  2011 Regional League Division 2 winners were Ratchaburi

See also
 2011 Thai Premier League
 2011 Thai Division 1 League
 2011 Thai FA Cup
 2011 Kor Royal Cup

External links
Thailand 2011 RSSSF

 
Thai League T4 seasons
3